Peanut oil, also known as groundnut oil or arachis oil, is a vegetable oil derived from peanuts. The oil usually has a mild or neutral flavor but, if made with roasted peanuts, has a stronger peanut flavor and aroma. It is often used in American, Chinese, Indian, African and Southeast Asian cuisine, both for general cooking, and in the case of roasted oil, for added flavor. Peanut oil has a high smoke point relative to many other cooking oils, so it is commonly used for frying foods.

History
Due to war shortages of other oils, use of readily available peanut oil increased in the United States during World War II.

Production

Uses
Unrefined peanut oil is used as a flavorant for dishes akin to sesame oil. Refined peanut oil is commonly used for frying volume batches of foods like French fries and has a smoke point of 450 °F/232 °C.

Biodiesel
At the 1900 Paris Exhibition, the Otto Company, at the request of the French Government, demonstrated that peanut oil could be used as a source of fuel for the diesel engine; this was one of the earliest demonstrations of biodiesel technology.

Other uses
Peanut oil, as with other vegetable oils, can be used to make soap by the process of saponification. Peanut oil is safe for use as a massage oil.

Composition
Its major component fatty acids are oleic acid (46.8% as olein), linoleic acid (33.4% as linolein), and palmitic acid (10.0% as palmitin). The oil also contains some stearic acid, arachidic acid, behenic acid, lignoceric acid and other fatty acids.

Nutritional content

Peanut oil is 17% saturated fat, 46% monounsaturated fat, and 32% polyunsaturated fat (table).

Health issues

Toxins
If quality control is neglected, peanuts that contain the mold that produces highly toxic aflatoxin can end up contaminating the oil derived from them.

Allergens
Those allergic to peanuts can consume highly refined peanut oil, but should avoid first-press, organic oil. Most highly refined peanut oils remove the peanut allergens and have been shown to be safe for "the vast majority of peanut-allergic individuals". However, cold-pressed peanut oils may not remove the allergens and thus could be highly dangerous to people with peanut allergy.

Since the degree of processing for any particular product is often unclear, many believe that "avoidance is prudent".

References

External links

Peanut oil at WebMD

Cooking oils
Peanuts
Vegetable oils